Unionist may refer to:

A member or supporter of a trade union

Europe

United Kingdom
Unionism in the United Kingdom
Unionism in Ireland
Unionism in Scotland
Unionist Party (Scotland)
Scottish Conservative & Unionist Association
Conservative Party, known simply as Conservatives

Other places in Europe
Movement for the unification of Romania and Moldova, Romanian-Moldovan Unionists
Spanish unionism
Committee of Union and Progress, commonly CUP or Unionists, Turkey (Ottoman Empire)
Unionism in Belgium

Asia
Unionist Party (Punjab), India

North America
Unionist (United States), a member or supporter of the twenty-three Northern states that were not part of the seceding Confederacy during the American Civil War
Southern Unionist, a White Southerner who either opposed secession and the Confederate States of America and/or supported the Union or stayed neutral
National Union Party (United States), a political party that ran briefly in the 1864 presidential election
Unionist Party (Canada), a merger of parties that led Canada during World War I

See also
Unionist Party (disambiguation)
Unionism (disambiguation)
Union (disambiguation)